Arnold Bruggink (born 24 July 1977) is a Dutch former professional footballer who played as an attacking midfielder.

Club career
Born in Almelo, Overijssel, Bruggink started his professional career at FC Twente, where he became the club's leading goalscorer in the 1995–96 season.

He joined PSV Eindhoven in 1997, winning the Dutch Talent of the Year award in 2000. He also won three league titles and two Supercups with the club, as well as appearing in the UEFA Champions League.

After six seasons in Eindhoven, he moved to Spanish club RCD Mallorca in 2003, where he played in the UEFA Cup.

Bruggink moved back to his homeland after just one season joining SC Heerenveen. He spent two seasons playing for them in the Eredivisie and in two successive UEFA Cup campaigns, before again heading abroad when he joined German side Hannover 96 in 2006. He left the club after his contract was not renewed at the end of the 2009–10 season.

He rejoined Twente, only to finish his career after one season.

International career
Bruggink played 31 times for the Dutch U-21 national team, which equals a record with Roy Makaay. 
He made two appearances for the Dutch national team in 2000, a 2002 World Cup qualifier against the Republic of Ireland on 2 September and a friendly against Spain on 15 November.

Retirement
Bruggink currently works as a pundit and color commentator for several TV stations in the Netherlands and Germany.

Honours
PSV
 Eredivisie: 1999–2000, 2000–01, 2002–03
 Johan Cruyff Shield: 2000, 2001

References

External links
 
 Profile 
 

1977 births
Living people
Sportspeople from Almelo
Footballers from Overijssel
Dutch footballers
Netherlands under-21 international footballers
Netherlands international footballers
Association football midfielders
FC Twente players
PSV Eindhoven players
RCD Mallorca players
SC Heerenveen players
Hannover 96 players
Eredivisie players
La Liga players
Bundesliga players
Dutch expatriate footballers
Expatriate footballers in Germany
Expatriate footballers in Spain
Dutch expatriate sportspeople in Germany
Dutch expatriate sportspeople in Spain